Lamine Camara (born 1 January 2004) is a Senegalese professional footballer who plays as a midfielder for Metz B.

Club career
In February 2023, Camara signed for French side Metz on a three-and-a-half year deal.

International career

Youth
Camara was called up to the Senegalese under-20 side for the 2023 Africa U-20 Cup of Nations.

Senior
Camara represented the Senegalese national team at the 2022 African Nations Championship, where he was named best young player of the group stage.

Career statistics

Club

Notes

International

Scores and results list Senegal's goal tally first, score column indicates score after each Camara goal.

Honours 
Senegal U20

 U-20 Africa Cup of Nations: 2023
 U-20 West B Zone Tournament: 2022

Senegal

 African Nations Championship: 2022
 COSAFA Cup third place: 2022

Individual

 U-20 Africa Cup of Nations Player of the Tournament: 2023
 African Nations Championship Young Player of the Group Stages: 2022
 African Nations Championship Team of the Tournament: 2022

References

2004 births
Living people
Senegalese footballers
Senegal youth international footballers
Senegal international footballers
Association football midfielders
Senegal Premier League players
Casa Sports players
Génération Foot players
FC Metz players
Senegalese expatriate footballers
Senegalese expatriate sportspeople in France
Expatriate footballers in France
Senegal A' international footballers
2022 African Nations Championship players